In human anatomy, the infraorbital foramen is one of two small holes in the skull's upper jawbone (maxillary bone), located below the eye socket and to the left and right of the nose. Both holes are used for blood vessels and nerves. In anatomical terms, it is located below the infraorbital margin of the orbit. It transmits the infraorbital artery and vein, and the infraorbital nerve, a branch of the maxillary nerve.  It is typically  from the infraorbital margin.

Structure
Forming the exterior end of the infraorbital canal, the infraorbital foramen communicates with the infraorbital groove, the canal's opening on the interior side.

The ramifications of the three principal branches of the trigeminal nerve—at the supraorbital, infraorbital, and mental foramen—are distributed on a vertical line (in anterior view) passing through the middle of the pupil.  The infraorbital foramen is used as a pressure point to test the sensitivity of the infraorbital nerve. Palpation of the infraorbital foramen during an extraoral examination or an administration of a local anesthetic agent will cause soreness to the area.

See also
 Foramina of the skull

Additional images

References

External links
 
  (closeup)
  (distance)
 Upstate.edu
 

Foramina of the skull